The Field Maple Acer campestre cultivar 'Elegant' was released by the Gelderse Nursery in Opheusden, Netherlands in 1990.

Description
The tree grows to a height of < 15 m / About 49 Feet,  and has a compact, slender, ovoid crown comprising ascending branches, making it particularly suitable as a street tree.

Cultivation
As with the species, 'Compactum' thrives best in a semi shade position, on a fertile, well-drained soil.

Synonymy
'Elegant' is probably synonymous with 'Huibers Elegant'.

Accessions
None known.

References 

Field maple cultivars